Eupanacra variolosa, the grown rippled hawkmoth, is a moth of the family Sphingidae.

Distribution 
It is known from north-eastern India, Bangladesh, south-western China, Thailand, Malaysia (Peninsular, Sarawak) and Indonesia (Sumatra, Java, Kalimantan).

Description 
The wingspan is 56–80 mm. It is similar to Eupanacra busiris atima except for differences in the forewing outer margin and the trajectory of the antemedian lines on the forewing upperside. There is a short, narrow and pale median band on the hindwing upperside.

Biology 
The larvae feed on Scindapsus pictus and Scindapsus aureus in Thailand.

References

Eupanacra
Moths described in 1856